Stanley Okumbi (born in Kenya) is a Kenyan football manager.

References

Living people
Kenyan football managers
Kenya national football team managers
Year of birth missing (living people)